Onychopterellidae are an extinct family of eurypterids. The family is the only family classified as part of the superfamily Onychopterelloidea. Genera included are Alkenopterus, Onychopterella and Tylopterella.

See also 
 List of eurypterids

References 

Onychopterelloidea
Devonian animals
Ordovician animals
Prehistoric arthropod families